The Swiss Solvency Test (SST) is a risk based capital standard for insurance companies in Switzerland, in use since 2006. The SST was developed by the Swiss Federal Office of Private Insurance (FOPI) in cooperation with the Swiss insurance industry.

See also 
 Solvency II
 Capital adequacy ratio

Financial regulation
Insurance legislation
Capital requirement
Regulation in Switzerland